Altica oleracea is a species of leaf beetle belonging to the family Chrysomelidae, subfamily Galerucinae.

Etymology

Subspecies
Subspecies include:
 Altica oleracea subsp. breddini  (Mohr, 1958) 
 Altica oleracea subsp. oleracea  (Linnaeus, 1758)

Distribution and habitat

This species is present in whole Palaearctic realm. except Northern Africa. Bushes and shrubs form their typical habitat.

Description
Their color varies between metallic green, blue-green, blue to golden green. Legs and antennae are dark. The posterior femora are thickened. The pronotum has a delicate transverse furrow on the basal half. The elytra are finely punctured. Altica oleracea is difficult to distinguish from related species. This is usually only possible by examining the male genitalia.

Biology
These beetles are observed from March to autumn. In early summer they lay their eggs on their host plants, which are also their forage plants. In fact larvae and adults of Altica oleracea are phytophagous, feeding on various plants, especially Onagraceae, Ericaceae and Rosaceae species.

Bibliography 
Anderson, R., Nash, R. & O'Connor, J.P.. 1997, Irish Coleoptera: a revised and annotated list, Irish Naturalists' Journal Special Entomological Supplement, 1-81
du Chatenet, G, 2000, Coléoptères Phytophages D’Europe, NAP Editions,
Joy, N.H., 1932, A practical handbook of British beetles, H.F. & G. Witherby,
 This article has been expanded using, inter alia, material based on a translation of an article from the Deutsch Wikipedia, by the same name.

External links
Invertebrate Online
 Aramel

References 

Beetles described in 1758
Beetles of Europe
Alticini
Taxa named by Carl Linnaeus